Qaleh-ye Panjeh, also written Qila-e Panjeh and Kala Panja, is a village in Wakhan, Badakhshan Province in north-eastern Afghanistan.  It lies on the Panj River, near the confluence of the Wakhan River and the Pamir River.

Qaleh-ye Panjeh was once the capital of the Mirdom of Wakhan. Near the village is the former hunting lodge of Zahir Shah, the last king of Afghanistan. The village also contains the holy shrine of Panja Shah.

The village is inhabited by Wakhi people. The population of the village (2003) is 640.

In July 2021 the village was captured by the Taliban.

See also
Badakhshan Province

References

External links
Satellite map at Maplandia.com

Populated places in Badakhshan Province
Wakhan